is a song recorded by Japanese duo Yoasobi from their second EP, The Book 2 (2021). It was released as a stand-alone digital single on August 9, 2021, through Sony Music Entertainment Japan. The song was written by Ayase and based on Hatsune's letter Ongaku-san e from Letter Song Project, which collaborated with the Tokyo FM's radio show Sunday's Post. The song peaked at number three on the Oricon Combined Singles Chart, and number four on the Billboard Japan Hot 100.

Background and release

On August 30, 2020, Tokyo FM's radio show owned by Japan Post Service, titled Sunday's Post announced the collaboration with Yoasobi, Letter Song Project, to produce a song from a letter listener's thoughts or expectations with the theme "thank you". The winner was announced on July 25, 2021, to sixth-grade student Hatsune's letter, titled , which spells out gratitude for the music. On August 1, the song was aired for the first time on the radio show and announced the title "Loveletter" and release date on August 9 to digital music and streaming platforms. Later, the song was included on their second EP The Book 2, released on December 1. The English version of the song was included on the duo's second English-language EP E-Side 2, released on November 18, 2022.

Composition and lyrics

"Loveletter" was written by Ayase, a member of the group, and composed in the key of G major, 100 beats per minute with a running time of 3 minutes and 32 seconds. The song is described as a "magnificent" song that depicts a vivid spread of music and love with various feelings. The song was attended by Osaka Tōin Senior High School Brass Band Club, who co-starred in their online concert collaborated with Uniqlo's UT Sing Your World.

Commercial performance

In Japan, "Loveletter" debuted at number one on the Oricon Digital Single (Single Track) Chart for the chart issue date of August 23, 2021 with 37,281 download units, following "Sangenshoku" that released on July, becoming the seventh song that charted number one on the chart. The song also peaked at number three on the Combined Singles Chart with 26,236 points, and number 18 on the Streaming Chart with 3,396,806 streams. For Billboard Japan Hot 100, "Loveletter" debuted at number four, behind SixTones's "Mascara", BTS' "Butter", and "Permission to Dance", atop of Download Songs with 31,392 download units, and number 17 on Streaming Songs. "Loveletter" also peaked at number 96 on the Billboard Global Excl. US.

Music video

An accompanying music video of "Loveletter" was initially set to be premiered on August 24, 2021, but had been postponed to August 31 due to production reasons. Directed by Satoru Ohno from ThinkR, art directed by Banishment, and animation directed by Ryō Ishii, the music video depicts the various gratitude contained in the based letter spreading on the music with the vivid scene. The music video begins with a girl holding her letter showing her love in music. It continues as she walks through her school until she sees a heart that explodes into music staves as it flies across the sky, and she runs after it. It ends up with the girl's friends joining her, chasing after the music, and enjoying it together with musical instruments background.

Live performance

Yoasobi gave a debut performance of "Loveletter" on NHK's music show Songs on December 2, 2021, alongside "Taishō Roman", and "Tsubame".

Usage in media

"Loveletter" was featured in the 20th anniversary commercial of Puré, starring Marika Itō.

Credits and personnel

Credits adapted from The Book 2 liner notes and YouTube.

Song

 Ayase – producer, songwriter
 Ikura – vocals
 Hatsune – based story writer
 Mikio Gōma – bass arrangement
 Osaka Tōin Senior High School's Brass Band Club – brass instrument
 Takashi Umeda – conductor
 Takayuki Saitō – vocal recording
 Masahiko Fukui – mixing
 Flat Studio – cover artwork design

Music video

 Satoru Ohno (ThinkR) – director
 Yumi Nakamura – character design, executive animation director, color scheme design
 Kaori Fukui – animation director
 Aoi Yamane – original animation director assistant
 Takahide Ejiri – original animation director assistant
 Yū Kaneshiro – original animation director assistant
 Fumio Matsumoto – key animation
 Yoshito Narimatsu – key animation
 Yū Fukuoka – key animation
 Naoko Hayashi – key animation
 Haruna Hashimoto – key animation
 Mitsutaka Echigo – key animation
 Tetsuya Yoshimoto – second key animation
 Kaichi Baba – second key animation
 Kashiwaten – second key animation
 Ryūnosuke Kamida – second key animation
 Seiko Terashima – second key animation
 Yoshi Kirishima – second key animation
 Celenecosmos – second key animation
 Porkky – second key animation
 Leandro Duarte – second key animation
 Masashi Makino – in-between animation
 Shenron – in-between animation, finishing
 FAI – in-between animation, finishing
 GK Sales – in-between animation, finishing
 Inō Akihiro – in-between animation checking
 Saori Murakoshi – color style, color checking
 Defer Co., Ltd. – checking assistant
 Hajime Satō
 Ayumi Nakahara
 Yuki Tozawa
 Nodoka Kadowaki – production assistant
 Banishment (Flat Studio) – art director, 3D CGI
 Studio WHO – art production assistance
 Sachiko15 – art production assistance
 Anhelo – art production assistance
 Shūsaku Takayanagi – 3D CGI director, compositing director
 V-Sign – 3D CGI
 Acca Effe – compositing
 Emi Irisa – compositing
 Sanneku Animation Co., Ltd. – compositing
 Lucas Cisterne – compositing
 Toshihide Fujii – compositing
 Kiyotake Tamura – compositing
 Hironobu Nagasawa – compositing
 Tomoyuki Ishiyama – compositing
 Shin Kuribayashi (Silver Link.) – compositing assistant
 Konbu – compositing assistant
 Haruka Wakai – graphic design
 Shogo Saitō – production manager
 Matsumoto Kohei (ThinkR) – producer
 Ryō Ishii (Flat Studio) – animation producer

Charts

Weekly charts

Year-end charts

Certifications

Release history

References

External links
 

2021 singles
2021 songs
Japanese-language songs
Songs about letters (message)
Songs about music
Sony Music Entertainment Japan singles
Yoasobi songs